Ruskin High School may refer to:

Ruskin High School, Crewe, a secondary school in Crewe, Cheshire, England
Ruskin High School, Kansas City, a high school in Kansas City, Missouri, United States

See also
Ruskin (disambiguation)